Raman may refer to:

People
Raman (name)
C. V. Raman (1888–1970), Indian Nobel Prize-winning physicist

Places
 Raman, Punjab (India)
 Raman, Rawalpindi, Pakistan
 Raman District, Yala Province, Thailand
 Raman Railway Station
 Raman oil field, in Batman, Turkey

Other uses 
 Raman (crater), a lunar impact crater
 Raman (film), a 2008 Indian Malayalam film
 Raman Scattering, a physical effect named after C. V. Raman
 Raman Spectroscopy, an analytical technique based on Raman Scattering

See also
 
 Rahman (disambiguation)
 Rama (disambiguation)
 Ramen (disambiguation)
 Rehman (disambiguation)
 Ramman, or Hadad, a storm and rain god